Peter A Dannenberg (Russian Пётр Андреевич Данненберг; 9 June 1792 – 6 August 1872) was a general, particularly notable for his command during the Crimean War. He was from the Russian Empire.

Life
Born into a reformed church family on 19 June 1792 in Olonets Governorate, his early education was at the Sofia Institute of Forestry (1807–1810), from which he moved to the Imperial Forestry Institute in Saint Petersburg, from which he graduated in 1811, from the scientist and surveyor course, with the rank of 13th grade. On graduation he became a secretary-policeman but that same year decided to switch to military service and so enrolled in the Kolonnovozhatyh College. He successfully completed their science course and on 26 January 1812 was promoted to the rank of ensign in a quartermaster unit and a secondment to the 24th Infantry Division.

In his twenties he fought the French invasion of Russia, seeing action at Smolensk on 12 June 1812, Borodino on August 26, Tarutino on October 6 and Maloyaroslavets on October 12. For his actions at Maloyaroslavets he was awarded the Order of Saint Vladimir 4th class, with swords and bow and finally, from 3 to 10 November, at Krasnoi. For his bravery, he was promoted to second lieutenant on 4 December 1812. As the Russians advanced into Germany, he fought at Lutzen on April 20, 1813, on 16 August near Dresden, on 17 and 18 August at Kulm (for which he received the Kulm Cross) and then 4 and 6 October near Leipzig. Whilst in the reserves in 1814, he also fought at Brienne, Arcis-sur-Aube, Fère-Champenoise, at a skirmish near Paris on March 18 and finally in the capture of Paris on 19 March. Grand Duke Konstantin Pavlovich appointed him to his personal staff and Dannenberg also received promotions to lieutenant and captain along with the Order of St Anne 2nd class. On 1 August 1814 he was transferred to the General Staff of the Guards. He was then promoted to colonel (1818) and Major-General (1827) with the appointment of Quartermaster-General Chief of Staff to the Tsarevich.

During the Crimean War, Dannenberg was given command of Russian troops on the Danube front where he lost the Battle of Oltenitza. When the fighting moved to the Crimea, he was given command of part of the Russian forces there, which unsuccessfully assaulted the British positions during the Battle of Inkerman.

Awards
 Order of St. Vladimir 4th class (1812), 1st class (1862)
 Kulm Cross (1813)
 Order of St. Anne 2nd class (1814), 1st class (1831)
 Order of St. George 4th class (1839)

1792 births
1872 deaths
Russian commanders of the Napoleonic Wars
Russian military personnel of the Crimean War
Foresters from the Russian Empire
Saint-Petersburg State Forestry University alumni
People from Olonets Governorate